Muringeri is a village located in Anjarakkandy in Kannur district.

References 

Kannur